was a railway station on the Kaikyo Line in Sotogahama, Aomori, Japan, operated by Hokkaido Railway Company (JR Hokkaido). The station is located within the Seikan Tunnel below the seabed of the Tsugaru Strait linking the main Japanese island of Honshu with the northern island of Hokkaido. It was closed to passengers from November 10, 2013, to make way for the construction of the Hokkaido Shinkansen high-speed train line. It is an emergency escape point.

Lines
Tappi-Kaitei Station was served by the Kaikyō Line, but only a few trains actually stopped at this station.

Station layout
Tappi-Kaitei Station had two opposed side platforms serving two underground tracks. However, only the northbound platform was used. The platforms are connected by an underground cable car to the surface. The station housed a museum detailing the construction and operation of the tunnel. Yoshioka-Kaitei Station, Japan's deepest underground station, is located on the Hokkaido side of the tunnel.

Platforms

History
Tappi-Kaitei Station opened on March 13, 1988. It was closed to passengers from November 10, 2013 due to construction work connected with the Hokkaido Shinkansen, and formally closed as of the end of March 14, 2014.

See also
 List of railway stations in Japan

References

External links

JR Hakodate website 
Seikan Tunnel Museum website 

Railway stations in Japan opened in 1988
Railway stations in Aomori Prefecture
Stations of Hokkaido Railway Company
Seikan Tunnel
Tsugaru-Kaikyō Line
Sotogahama, Aomori
Railway stations closed in 2014
Defunct railway stations in Japan